Conalcaea is a genus of spur-throated grasshoppers in the family Acrididae. There are at least three described species in Conalcaea.

Species
These three species belong to the genus Conalcaea:
 Conalcaea cantralli Gurney, 1951 i c g b
 Conalcaea huachucana Rehn, 1907 i c g b (huachuca grasshopper)
 Conalcaea miguelitana Scudder, S.H., 1897 c g
Data sources: i = ITIS, c = Catalogue of Life, g = GBIF, b = Bugguide.net

References

Further reading

 
 

Melanoplinae
Articles created by Qbugbot